Tennis at the 2009 European Youth Summer Olympic Festival was held at Tampere Tennis Centre, Tampere, Finland from 19 to 24 July 2009.

Tennis had doubles and singles events for men and women competition.

Medalists

Medal table

References

External links
 Official website

2009 European Youth Summer Olympic Festival
European Youth Summer Olympic Festival
2009
2009 European Youth